The 2006 U.S. Men's Clay Court Championships was an Association of Tennis Professionals men's tennis tournament held in Houston, Texas in the United States. The event was played on outdoor clay courts and was part of the International Series of the 2006 ATP Tour. It was the 38th edition of the tournament and was held from April 10 to April 17, 2006. Unseeded Mardy Fish, who entered on a wildcard, won the singles title.

Finals

Singles

 Mardy Fish defeated  Jürgen Melzer 3–6, 6–4, 6–3
 It was Fish's only title of the year and the 5th of his career.

Doubles

 Michael Kohlmann /  Alexander Waske defeated  Julian Knowle /  Jürgen Melzer 5–7, 6–4, [10–5]
 It was Kohlmann's only title of the year and the 4th of his career. It was Waske's 1st title of the year and the 1st of his career.

References

External links 
 ATP Tournament Profile

 
U.S. Men's Clay Court Championships
U.S. Men's Clay Court Championships
U.S. Men's Clay Court Championships
U.S. Men's Clay Court Championships
U.S. Men's Clay Court Championships